The Port Adelaide Cup is a South Australian Jockey Club Listed Thoroughbred horse race for horses aged three years old and over, at quality handicap conditions, over a distance of 2,500 metres at the Morphettville Racecourse, Adelaide, Australia in the Autumn Carnival.

History
The race has assumed the history of the Port Adelaide Cup after the closure of Cheltenham Park Racecourse in 2009.

The race was the principal long distance race of the Port Adelaide Racing Club. It was held initially in the Christmas holiday period. However, after the demise of the club in 1975 and later the closure of the track where the race was predominantly held the race had lost its prestige when it was downgraded to a Listed race in 2003. The current SAJC has had less stability with the scheduling of the race having it run in February several times in the last 10 years.

Name
prior 2014 - Port Adelaide Cup
2015 - Japan Trophy
2016 - Port Adelaide Cup

Grade
1908–1985 - Principal Race
1979–2002 - Group 3
2003–2012 - Listed Race
2014 - Listed race

Venue
1906–1941 - Cheltenham Park 
1943 - Victoria Park Racecourse 
1944 - Morphettville
1945–1980 - Cheltenham Park
1981–1989 - Morphettville
1990–2009 - Cheltenham Park
2010 - Morphettville Parks (inner course)
2011 onwards - Morphettville

Distance
1906–1907 -  miles (~2400 metres)
1908–1909 -  miles (~1800 metres)
1910–1917 -  miles (~2200 metres)
1918–1920 -  miles (~2400 metres)
1921–1941 -  miles (~3050 metres)
1943 -  miles (~2200 metres)
1944 – 2 miles (~3200 metres)
1945–1972 -  miles (~3050 metres)
1973–1974 – 3050 metres
1975–1980 – 2400 metres
1981–1984 – 2500 metres
1985–2001 – 2400 metres
2002 – 2410 metres
2003–2005 – 2400 metres
2006–2010 – 2250 metres
2012 – 2019 metres
2013 onwards – 2500 metres

Winners

 2020 - Oceanex (NZ)
 2018 - Yogi (NZ)
 2017 - Time to Test
 2016 - Zanteca
 2015 - Go Dreaming
2014 - Ominous
2013 - Not held 
2012 - Finiguerra 
2011 - Maunatrice 
2010 - Right Fong 
2009 - Foolish Lad 
2008 - Richracer 
2007 - Wells Street 
2006 - Tingirana 
2005 - †race not held
2004 - Mr. Tambourineman 
2003 - Odysseus 
2002 - Moongara 
2001 - Astrolante 
2000 - Rydell High 
1999 - King's Landing 
1998 - Vestey 
1997 - Voodoo Beat 
1996 - Supercut 
1995 - Slygo Connection 
1994 - Ruling Knight 
1993 - Guessing Game 
1992 - Rasputin's Revenge 
1991 - Alphabel 
1990 - Leahlauda 
1989 - Master Eclipse 
1988 - Jolly Good Thought 
1987 - Hollinger 
1986 - Keepers 
1985 - Game Trooper 
1984 - Noble Falcon 
1983 - Barmax 
1982 - Darado Boy
1981 - Lady Nurmi
1980 - Rock Show
1979 - Diecaster
1978 - Linkman
1977 - Rain Circle
1976 - Classic Conquest
1975 - Strong Bow
1974 - Brugan
1973 - Brugan
1972 - Caliente
1971 - Caliente
1970 - Moomba Fox
1969 - Cartier
1968 - Jovial Knight
1967 - Floodbird
1966 - Jovial Knight
1965 - Bright Blend
1964 - Hunting Horn
1963 - Barbatook
1962 - Delville
1961 - Wine Label
1960 - Rose Of Summer
1959 - Sir Blink
1958 - Trois Model
1957 - Power Dive
1956 - Valpadi
1955 - Chatford
1954 - Beau Regis
1953 - Welloch
1952 - Sun Kist
1951 - Free Kick
1950 - Prince O' Fairies
1949 - Sanctus
1948 - Chievely
1947 - Bannerette
1946 - Baycades
1945 - Rainbird
1944 - Saint Warden   
1943 - Saint Warden 
1942 - †race not held
1941 - Renown
1940 - Apostrophe
1939 - Indignity
1938 - Grecian Princess
1937 - St. Fox
1936 - Yarro
1935 - Amalia
1934 - ‡Mellion / Supervalve
1933 - Silvado
1932 - Mary Spa
1931 - Celotex
1930 - Madstar
1929 - Nadean
1928 - Some Quality
1927 - Frilford
1926 - Parvista
1925 - Lemina
1924 - Lemina
1923 - Stand By
1922 - Black Rogue
1921 - Pop Pop
1920 - Paratoo
1919 - Alacrity
1918 - Pistol Prince
1917 - Bangonie
1916 - Admirable Bob
1915 - Pistolier
1914 - Bangonie
1913 - Calamus
1912 - Balmoral
1911 - Kirn
1910 - Fastness
1909 - Carl Dour
1908 - Becky
1907 - Metal Queen
1906 - Enigma

† Race not held in that year due to switch race date in the racing calendar. The SAJC moved the race to the late summer for the 2005–06 racing season. Originally the race was held during the PARC Christmas Carnival.
¶ Race not held due to a ban on war time racing in the state.
‡ Dead heat

See also
 Group races
 List of Australian Group races
 Queen's Cup (horse race), a national race sometimes held in Adelaide

References

Horse races in Australia
Sport in Adelaide
1906 establishments in Australia
Recurring sporting events established in 1906